Geodina is a genus of fungi in the family Sarcoscyphaceae. This genus contains two species: Geodina guanacastensis, found in Costa Rica, and Geodina salmonicolor, found in the Dominican Republic.

References

External links
Geodina at Index Fungorum

Sarcoscyphaceae